Xylecata biformis is a moth of the subfamily Arctiinae. It is found on Madagascar.

References

Nyctemerina